The Hull note, officially the Outline of Proposed Basis for Agreement Between the United States and Japan, was the final proposal delivered to the Empire of Japan by the  United States of America before the attack on Pearl Harbor (December 7, 1941) and the Japanese declaration of war (seven and a half hours after the attack began). The note, delivered on November 26, 1941, is named for  Secretary of State Cordell Hull (in office: 1933-1944). It was the diplomatic culmination of a series of events leading to the attack on Pearl Harbor. Notably, its text repeats previous American demands for Japan to withdraw from  China and from French Indochina. No further American proposals were made before the attack on Pearl Harbor, as the US government had received intelligence that Japan was preparing an invasion of Thailand.

Background
The United States objected to the Second Sino-Japanese War and the occupation of the Manchuria area of China by Japanese troops and settlers. In protest, the United States sent support to the Nationalist government of Chiang Kai-shek. In July 1941, Japanese military units occupied southern French Indochina, violating a gentlemen's agreement. Japanese bombers quickly moved into bases in Saigon and Cambodia, from which they could attack British Malaya. As a result, the US government imposed trade sanctions on Japan, including the freezing of Japanese assets in the United States; this effectively created an embargo of oil exports, as Japan did not have the necessary currency with which to buy American oil. 

Dean Acheson, a senior U.S. State Department official, was the key decision maker. He shifted American policy away from export restrictions and toward "full-blooded financial warfare against Japan." This financial freeze was described by Miller as "the most devastating American action against Japan."

Final attempts at peace
On November 5, 1941, Emperor Hirohito approved, in Imperial Conference, the plan for the attack on Pearl Harbor. At the same time, his government made a last effort to arrive at a diplomatic solution of their differences with the United States. Ambassador Kichisaburō Nomura presented two proposals to the American government.

The first, Proposal A, was presented by him on November 6, 1941. It proposed making a final settlement of the Sino-Japanese War with a partial withdrawal of Japanese troops. United States military intelligence had deciphered some of Japan's diplomatic codes so they knew that there was a second proposal in case it failed. The United States government stalled and then rejected it on November 14, 1941.

On November 20, 1941, Nomura presented Proposal B, which offered to withdraw Japanese forces from southern Indochina if the United States agreed to end aid to the Nationalist Chinese, freeze military deployments in Southeast Asia (except for Japan's reinforcement of northern Indochina), provide Japan with "a required quantity of oil," and assist Japan in acquiring materials from the Dutch East Indies. The United States was about to make a counteroffer to this plan, which included a monthly supply of fuel for civilian use. However, President Franklin D. Roosevelt received a leak of Japan's war plan and news that Japanese troopships were on their way to Indochina. He then decided that the Japanese were not being sincere in their negotiations and instructed Secretary Hull to drop the counterproposal.

By November 26, top American officials at the White House, State, Navy and War departments believed that Japan was moving invasion forces toward Thailand. They also believed that the Japanese foreign ministry had put an absolute deadline on negotiations of November 29 because "after that things are automatically going to happen." The Americans were convinced that war would start in a matter of days, probably with a surprise Japanese attack.

The previous plan, to present Japan with a temporary modus vivendi, was strongly opposed by China and Britain and dropped.

Content
The Hull Note consists of two sections. The first section is a "Draft mutual declaration of policy" by stating these principles:

 inviolability of territorial integrity and sovereignty of each and all nations.
 non-interference in the internal affairs of other countries.
 equality, including equality of commercial opportunity and treatment.
 reliance upon international cooperation and conciliation for the prevention and pacific settlement of controversies
 non-discrimination in international commercial relations.
 international economic cooperation and abolition of extreme nationalism as expressed in excessive trade restrictions.
 non-discriminatory access by all nations to raw material supplies.
 full protection of the interests of consuming countries and populations as regards the operation of international commodity agreements.
 establishment of such institutions and arrangements of international finances 

The second section consists of 10 points and is titled "Steps to be taken by the Government of the United States and by the Government of Japan"

 multilateral non-aggression pact among the British Empire, China, Japan, the Netherlands, the Soviet Union, Thailand and the United States
 pledge itself to respect the territorial integrity of French Indochina 
 withdraw of all military, naval, air and police forces from China and from Indo-China
 no support (militarily, politically, economically) of any Government or regime in China other than the national Government of the Republic of China
 Both Governments to give up all extraterritorial rights in China
 enter into negotiations for the conclusion between the United States and Japan of a trade agreement, based upon reciprocal most favored-nation treatment
 remove the freezing restrictions on Japanese funds in the United States and on American funds in Japan
 agree upon a plan for the stabilization of the dollar-yen rate
 no agreement with any third powers to conflict with the fundamental purpose of this agreement
 influence other Governments to adhere to the basic political and economic principles in this agreement

Delivery to and reception by the Japanese government
On November 26, 1941, Hull presented the Japanese ambassador with the Hull note, which, as one of its conditions, demanded the complete withdrawal of all Japanese troops from French Indochina and China. Japanese Prime Minister Tojo Hideki said to his cabinet that "this is an ultimatum."

Final decision made to attack
The strike force that attacked Pearl Harbor had set sail the day before, on the morning of November 26, 1941, Japan time, which was November 25, Washington time. It could have been recalled along the way, but no further diplomatic progress was made.

At an Imperial Conference on December 1, Emperor Hirohito approved attacks against the United States, the British Empire and the Dutch colonial empire. On December 4, President Roosevelt was warned by a 26-page ONI memo that the Japanese were showing particular interest in the (US) West Coast, the Panama Canal and the Territory of Hawaii. On December 7–8 the Japanese began attacks against the Philippines, Guam, Wake Island, Malaya, Singapore, Hong Kong and  Hawaii.

Retrospective assessments
In 1948, historian Charles A. Beard argued that the note was an ultimatum which meant unnecessary war. Some modern Japanese commentators say that the note was designed to draw Japan into war in such a way as to allow Japan to be presented as the aggressor nation. Toshio Tamogami, who was the Japan Air Self-Defense Force chief of staff, was forcibly retired by the Japanese government in 2008 for taking this position.

According to Benn Steil, director of international economics at the Council on Foreign Relations, "the Japanese government made the decision to move forward with the Pearl Harbor strike after receiving the ultimatum."

See also
Japanese declaration of war on the United States and the British Empire
 McCollum memo
 War Plan Orange

Notes

References
 Costello, John, The Pacific War 1941-1945 (New York: William Morrow, 1982) 
 Dallek, Robert. Franklin D. Roosevelt and American foreign policy, 1932-1945 (Oxford University Press, 1979)
 Langer, William L. and S. Everett Gleason. The undeclared war, 1940-1941 (1953), highly detailed semi-official US government history, esp pp 871–901
 Gordon W. Prange, At Dawn We Slept (McGraw-Hill, 1981), Pearl Harbor: The Verdict of History (McGraw-Hill, 1986), and December 7, 1941: The Day the Japanese Attacked Pearl Harbor (McGraw-Hill, 1988). This monumental trilogy, written with collaborators Donald M. Goldstein and Katherine V. Dillon, is considered the authoritative work on the subject.
 Peter Wetzler, Hirohito and War, University of Hawaii Press, 1998 
 Beard, Charles A. President Roosevelt and the Coming of the War 1941 (Yale UP, 1948)
 Fish, Hamilton. Tragic Deception: FDR and America's Involvement in World War II (Devin-Adair Pub, 1983) 
 Morgenstern, George Edward. Pearl Harbor: The Story of the Secret War (The Devin-Adair Company, 1947) .
 Robert A. Theobald, Final Secret of Pearl Harbor (Devin-Adair Pub, 1954)

External links

 Full text of the Hull note

Military history of Japan during World War II
Military history of the United States during World War II
Attack on Pearl Harbor
Government documents
Ultimata
1941 documents
Japan–United States relations